Mathilde Pichery (born 1981) is a French slalom canoeist who competed in the 2000s.

She won two gold medals in the K1 team event at the ICF Canoe Slalom World Championships, earning them in 2002 and 2006. She also won four bronze medals at the European Championships.

World Cup individual podiums

1 European Championship counting for World Cup points

References

French female canoeists
Living people
1981 births
Medalists at the ICF Canoe Slalom World Championships